Rebels is a 2019 French comedy directed and written by Allan Mauduit.

Plot
Sandra, a young woman forced to leave the south of France to flee a violent husband. Without attachment, she returned to Boulogne-sur-Mer, the city of her childhood which she left almost 15 years ago. She finds her mother there and a world she left behind. Without money, she is hired in a fish cannery where she befriends two workers. But one day, one of her colleagues tackles her insistently, she defends herself and kills him accidentally ...

Cast
 Cécile de France : Sandra Dréant
 Yolande Moreau : Nadine Dewulder
 Audrey Lamy : Marilyn Santos
 Simon Abkarian : Simon Bénéké
 Béatrice Agenin : Sandra's mother
 Eric Godon : Belgian 1
 Sandy Cys : figurante 
 Anthony Dufour : figurant

Production
Principal photography on the film began 26 February 2018 and lasted til 4 May 2018 in the North of France.

References

External links
 

2019 films
2019 comedy films
2010s French-language films
French comedy films
Films scored by Ludovic Bource
2010s French films